The Netherlands Billie Jean King Cup team represents the Netherlands in the Billie Jean King Cup tennis competition and are governed by the Koninklijke Nederlandse Lawn Tennis Bond. They currently compete in World Group II.

Current team
Most recent year-end rankings are used.

History
The Netherlands competed in its first Fed Cup in 1963.  Their best result was reaching the final in 1968, losing 3-0 to Australia, and 1997, losing 4-1 to France with Brenda Schultz-McCarthy winning her singles match against Mary Pierce.

In 1998, the team was relegated to the Europe/Africa Zone Group I, where they spent nearly all their time through 2013.

The Netherlands earned back-to-back promotions in 2014 and 2015 by defeating Japan and Australia respectively, thereby securing a spot in the 2016 Fed Cup World Group.

Results

1963–1969

1970–1979

1980–1989

1990–1999

2000–2009

2010–2019

2020–2029

References

External links

Billie Jean King Cup teams
Fed Cup
Fed Cup